Gabriela Rejala is a beauty pageant contestant who represented Paraguay in Miss World 2008 in South Africa.  She also represented Paraguay in Reina Hispanoamericana 2008 in Santa Cruz, Bolivia, on October 30, 2008, and placed as second runner-up. She was Top 16 semifinalist on Miss Earth 2009.

References

1989 births
Living people
People from Ñemby
Miss Earth 2009 contestants
Miss World 2008 delegates
Paraguayan beauty pageant winners